The Czech Warmblood, is a modern Czech breed of warmblood sport horse.

History 

The Czech Warmblood was selectively bred from the mid-twentieth century by cross-breeding local mares with stallions of various breeds; these may have included Oriental and Spanish horses, and others of the Furioso, the Hanoverian, the Oldenburger, the Thoroughbred and the Trakehner breeds.

It is the most numerous breed of horse in the Czech Republic.

Separate stud-books for these were established in 2004 and 2005 respectively.

Characteristics 

The Czech Warmblood is a robust, powerful horse bred with strong bones. The breed has a strong neck on an elegant body, a broad, long back, and good hooves, though they are sometimes flat. The mane and tail are very thick.

The Czech Warmblood is a relatively long-lived, unpretentious and relentless horse. The breed is willing and teachable with a very good temperament. Most are black, chestnut, bay or dark bay.

The stud farm in Kladruby plays a major role in the breeding of the Czech Warmblood. In the pedigree book, many other breeds are mentioned, for example Thoroughbred, Selle Français, Arabian and Anglo-Arabian.

Use 

The horses are used principally in show-jumping and in dressage; they are also suitable for recreational riding.

References 

Horse breeds
Horse breeds originating in the Czech Republic